The Darul Amaan Mosque is an Ahmadi Muslim mosque in Manchester, England. Located in Hulme, immediately south of Manchester city centre, the mosque is only a walking distance from the University of Manchester's South Campus. Built at a cost of over £1 million, the mosque was opened in 2012 by Caliph Mirza Masroor Ahmad, at a grand inauguration session attracting over 1,500 guests and dignitaries.

See also
 Islam in England

References

2012 establishments in England
Ahmadiyya mosques in the United Kingdom
Mosques in Manchester
Mosques completed in 2012